Dylan's Gospel is the only studio album by The Brothers & Sisters of L.A., a group of vocalists working as session musicians in the Los Angeles, California area during the album's recording in June 1969.  The Brothers & Sisters of L.A. was organized by Lou Adler specifically to record the album, which consists of gospel music-style covers of Bob Dylan songs. Members of the group included Merry Clayton and Gloria Jones. The album was first released in 1969 by Adler's own Ode Records label. It was initially a commercial flop, which convinced Adler not to reunite the Brothers and Sisters of L.A. for another performance. It was reissued by Light in the Attic Records on April 1, 2014.

Track listing

Personnel

The Brothers & Sisters of L.A.
Andrew Herd
Barbara Perrault
Billy Storm
Brenda Fitz
Carolyn Willis
Chester Pipkin
Clydie King
Don Wyatt
Edna Wright
Edward Wallace
Fred Willis
Georgetta Finchess
Ginger Blake
Gloria Jones
Gwen Johnson
Hazel Carmichael
Jesse Kirkland
Joseph Green
Julia Tillman
Lolietha White
Marjorie Cranford
Merry Clayton
Oma Drake
Patrice Holloway
Ruby Johnson
Sherlie Matthews
Sherrell Atwood
Shirley Allen

Technical personnel
Lou Adler - producer
Gene Page - arranger

See also
List of songs written by Bob Dylan
List of artists who have covered Bob Dylan songs

References

1969 albums
Ode Records albums
Bob Dylan tribute albums
Light in the Attic Records albums